Ippolito "Ito" Giani (5 September 1941 – 28 September 2018) was an Italian sprinter.

Biography
From 1963 to 1967 he took part in 20 international competitions, including the 1964 Summer Olympics, and won six medals. Domestically Giani won the 200 m Italian title in 1967.

Achievements

See also
 200 metres winners of Italian Athletics Championships
 Italy national relay team

References

External links
 

1941 births
2018 deaths
Italian male sprinters
Olympic athletes of Italy
Athletes (track and field) at the 1964 Summer Olympics
Mediterranean Games gold medalists for Italy
Athletes (track and field) at the 1967 Mediterranean Games
Universiade medalists in athletics (track and field)
Mediterranean Games medalists in athletics
Universiade gold medalists for Italy
Universiade bronze medalists for Italy
Sportspeople from Varese
Italian Athletics Championships winners